The Legend of Zorro is a 2005 American Western swashbuckler film directed by Martin Campbell, produced by Walter F. Parkes, Laurie MacDonald and Lloyd Phillips, with music by James Horner, and written by Roberto Orci and Alex Kurtzman. It is the sequel to 1998's The Mask of Zorro; Antonio Banderas and Catherine Zeta-Jones reprise their roles as the titular hero and his spouse, Elena, and Rufus Sewell stars as the villain, Count Armand. The film takes place in San Mateo County, California and was shot in San Luis Potosí, Mexico, with second-unit photography in Wellington, New Zealand. The film was theatrically released on October 28, 2005, by Columbia Pictures (instead of TriStar due to Columbia holding the sequel rights to TriStar's pre-1999 film library), and earned $142.4 million on a $65 million budget.

Plot
In 1850, nine years after the events of the first film, California is voting on whether to join the United States of America as a state. Alejandro Murrieta, now known as Don Alejandro De La Vega, foils a plot to steal the ballots, but during the fight with a gunman named Jacob McGivens, he briefly loses his mask. A pair of Pinkerton agents see his face and recognize him. The following day, the agents confront Alejandro's wife, Elena, and blackmail her into divorcing him.

Three months later, the separation from Elena and his son Joaquin, and the feeling that the people no longer need Zorro, are taking their toll on Alejandro. His childhood guardian, Father Felipe, convinces him to attend a party at French Count Armand's new vineyard. There, Alejandro discovers that Elena is dating the count, an admirer from her time spent in Europe. After leaving the party, Alejandro witnesses a huge explosion close to Armand's mansion and becomes suspicious of him.

McGivens leads an attack on the family of Guillermo Cortez, Alejandro's friend, to seize their land deed. Donning his mask again, Zorro succeeds in rescuing Guillermo's wife and son, but fails to save Guillermo and the deed. Zorro follows McGivens to Armand's mansion and discovers that Armand plans to build a railroad on Cortez's land. He also encounters Elena and, learning of an upcoming shipment, he tracks McGivens to a cove where the cargo is delivered. Unbeknownst to him, Joaquin also hitched a ride on McGiven's cart, having snuck out of a class field trip. Zorro saves his son from the bandits and, examining the shipment, he sees a piece of the cargo - a bar of soap - and the phrase Orbis Unum meaning One World in Latin on a crate lid. Upon researching the phrase, Felipe and Alejandro learn that Armand is the head of a secret society, the Knights of Aragon, which has been secretly ruling Europe. The United States is deemed a threat to the Knights, so they plan to throw the country into chaos before it can gain too much power.

Alejandro is captured and imprisoned by the Pinkertons, who reveal that they forced Elena to divorce Alejandro in order to get close to Armand and learn of his plans without the aid of Zorro as they dislike his vigilante ways and due to their own lack of legal authority to search Armand's home due to California not yet being a U.S. state. Joaquin frees Alejandro from captivity. Zorro goes to Armand's mansion, meets Elena, and eavesdrops on Armand's meeting. Elena, in order to distract Armand, brings him to terrace, & throws keys to armand's vault to Alejandro, as Armand kisses Elena. After accessing secret documents, Alejandro learns that the soap bars are secretly used as an ingredient for nitroglycerin, which Armand plans to distribute throughout the Confederate army, with the help of Confederate Colonel Beauregard, to destroy the Union. Zorro and Elena reconcile, and Zorro prepares to destroy the train carrying the explosives. McGivens arrives at Felipe's church to look for Zorro. Unable to find him, McGivens shoots the priest and kidnaps Joaquin.

Meanwhile, however, Armand's butler Ferroq tracks down and kills the Pinkertons and informs his master about Elena's deception. Armand confronts Elena, and takes her and Joaquin hostage on the train carrying the explosives, making Zorro unable to destroy it. Zorro is captured and unmasked in front of his son. Armand takes Joaquin and Elena away and orders McGivens to kill Alejandro. Felipe, having been saved from McGivens's bullet by the cross he wears, arrives, and he and Alejandro overpower and kill McGivens.

Zorro catches up with Armand, and they engage in a sword fight. Meanwhile, Elena has Joaquin escape into the back cars of the train, which she disconnects. Elena fights Ferroq in the nitro storage car and throws him and a bottle of nitro out of the car and at the feet of Colonel Beauregard at their prearranged meeting point, killing them. Further along the tracks, the governor prepares to sign the bill to make California a Union state. Joaquin collects Tornado, Zorro's horse, jumps off the train, and overtakes it. He hits a track switch, causing the train to harmlessly pass around the ceremony. Zorro and Armand's duel takes them to the very front of the train engine. Seeing the track is a dead end, Zorro hooks Armand to the train by tying him up on the front of the engine and escapes with Elena. The train crashes into the pile of rails at the end of the track, setting off the nitroglycerin, killing Armand and destroying the train.

With Zorro as an official witness, the governor signs the bill, and California becomes the 31st state of the United States of America. Felipe remarries Alejandro and Elena, and Alejandro apologizes to his son for hiding his identity, admitting that Zorro's identity is a family secret rather than just his own. With Elena's support, Zorro rides off on Tornado to his next mission.

Cast

 Antonio Banderas as Don Alejandro de la Vega / Zorro
 Catherine Zeta-Jones as Eléna de la Vega
 Rufus Sewell as Count Armand
 Nick Chinlund as Jacob McGivens
 Adrián Alonso as Joaquin de la Vega
 Julio Oscar Mechoso as Padre Felipe
 Shuler Hensley as Pike
 Michael Emerson as Harrigan
 Leo Burmester as Colonel Beauregard
 Tony Amendola as Padre Quintero
 Pedro Armendáriz, Jr. as Governor Riley
 Giovanna Zacarias as Blanca Cortez
 Raúl Méndez as Ferroq
 Alberto Reyes as Padre Ignacio

Alternate ending

An alternate ending, included on the DVD, shows a grown-up Joaquin putting on the costume and riding off into the sunset, following his father's and maternal grandfather Diego de la Vega's (portrayed by Anthony Hopkins in The Mask of Zorro) footsteps as Zorro, while the elderly Alejandro and Elena watch proudly. This was changed to the theatrical ending in order to allow for future sequels with Antonio Banderas and Catherine Zeta-Jones, something that never happened.

Historical references

The Legend of Zorro continues its predecessor's inclusion of Spanish historical elements of California history into the fiction, though many liberties have been taken. Alejandro, the Mexican-born Californian who became Zorro at the end of The Mask of Zorro, is a fictional brother to Joaquin Murrieta, for whom the character's son Joaquin is named. Military governor Bennet Riley, the last of California's heads of state prior to statehood, is portrayed, but the Maryland-born American is played by the Mexican actor Pedro Armendáriz Jr. who speaks English with a Hispanic accent. Leo Burmester plays R. S. Beauregard, a Confederate colonel whose character is not to be confused with the historical P. G. T. Beauregard. Pedro Mira plays a pre-Presidential Abraham Lincoln as an observer to California's statehood, though the real Lincoln never traveled to the region. The film also features a fictional monument called Bear Point, commemorating the site where the original Bear Flag of the California Republic flew briefly in 1846. Although the actual flag flew in Sonoma County, the film suggests that Bear Point is located in San Mateo County.

The Legend of Zorro, which takes place in 1850, includes a significant number of deviations from national history as well, particularly in depicting an organized Confederate States of America and a presumed completed First transcontinental railroad, each more than a decade before their times. Additional deviations include a quote from the Gettysburg Address, which would not be written until 1863. A map discovered by Zorro delineates two states (Arizona and New Mexico) that did not achieve statehood until 1912; several other states depicted on the map entered into the Union long after California. The film also features characters who identify themselves as agents of the Pinkerton Detective Agency, which had been established in the year 1850 but was known at the time as the North-Western Police Agency.

A deleted scene on the film's DVD features a short discussion on a magic lantern presentation.

The use of the Henry repeating rifle by Jacob McGivens is a mistake, it was introduced in the early 1860s and produced through 1866.

Music

Track listing

Reception
The Legend of Zorro currently holds a rating of 47 out of 100 on Metacritic, based on 33 reviews, indicating "mixed or average reviews." On Rotten Tomatoes, 26% of 138 reviews are positive, with an average rating of 4.9/10. The site's critics consensus states, "Zorro can survive a lot of things, but it looks like he can't survive marriage". Audiences polled by CinemaScore gave the film an average grade of "A-" on an A+ to F scale.

Roger Ebert of the Chicago Sun-Times gave the film a below-average review, awarding it one and a half out of four stars, commenting that "of all of the possible ideas about how to handle the Elena character, this movie has assembled the worst ones." James Berardinelli of ReelViews gave The Legend of Zorro two out of four stars, saying that "the action is routine", "the chemistry between the two leads, which was one of the highlights of The Mask of Zorro, has evaporated during the intervening years", and that the movie "fails to recapture the pleasure offered by The Mask of Zorro."

Stephanie Zacharek of Salon.com praised the film, calling it "entertaining, bold, and self-effacing at once", noting the civic and parental questions it raises. Slate Magazine critic David Edelstein also praised the film, in particular the action scenes, villains, and chemistry between Banderas and Zeta-Jones. Mick LaSalle of the San Francisco Chronicle said the film was "watchable – not remotely enjoyable, but watchable." Nathan Rabin of The Onions A.V. Club gave the film a lukewarm review, saying that "director Martin Campbell doles out action sequences stingily", and added that "The Legend of Zorro still feels like a half-hearted shrug of a sequel." Brian Lowry of Variety said that The Legend of Zorro is "considerably less charming than The Mask of Zorro", but added that the film "gets by mostly on dazzling stunt work and the pleasure of seeing its dashing and glamorous leads back in cape and gown." Lisa Schwarzbaum of Entertainment Weekly awarded the film a "B−" score. Schwarzbaum said that "too many scenes emphasize gross butchery over the elegance of the blade", but added that the film is "well-oiled" and praised the "fancy fight sequences".

Stephen Hunter of The Washington Post reacted negatively, calling The Legend of Zorro "a waste of talent, time, and money" and "stupid and boring". Marc Savlov of the Austin Chronicle was also not impressed, remarking that "there are precious few things for a Zorro fan – or a film fan, for that matter – not to loathe about The Legend of Zorro." The film did reasonably well at the box office, grossing $142,400,065 internationally, but did not match the success of its predecessor.

Home media
The film was released on DVD and VHS on January 31, 2006. It was later released on Blu-ray on December 11, 2007.

Potential crossover sequel
In June 2019, Tarantino had picked Jerrod Carmichael to co-write a film adaptation based on his crossover comic book series, Django/Zorro which was a crossover with Django Unchained. Tarantino and Jamie Foxx have both expressed interest in having Antonio Banderas reprise his role as Zorro from The Mask of Zorro and The Legend of Zorro in the film in addition to Foxx returning as Django Freeman.

References

External links

 
 
 
 
 
 The Legend of Zorro at Moviemistakes.com
 Slant magazine film review by Keith Uhlich

2005 films
2000s action adventure films
2000s superhero films
2005 Western (genre) films
American action adventure films
American Western (genre) films
American superhero films
Fictional depictions of Abraham Lincoln in film
Films about families
Films about terrorism
Films set in 1850
Films set in California
Films set in Mexico
Films set in New Zealand
Films set in San Francisco
Films set in the San Francisco Bay Area
Films shot in California
Films shot in Mexico
Films shot in New Zealand
Films shot in San Francisco
Films about Mexican Americans
Pre-statehood history of California
American swashbuckler films
Zorro films
Columbia Pictures films
Spyglass Entertainment films
Amblin Entertainment films
Films directed by Martin Campbell
Films scored by James Horner
Films with screenplays by Alex Kurtzman and Roberto Orci
Films with screenplays by Ted Elliott
Films with screenplays by Terry Rossio
Films produced by Walter F. Parkes
Films based on works by Johnston McCulley
Spanish-language American films
2000s English-language films
2000s Spanish-language films
2005 multilingual films
American multilingual films
2000s American films